Mukhtarkhan Qabylanbekuly Dildabekov (Mūhtarhan Qabylanbekūly Dıldäbekov; born March 19, 1976) is a Kazakh boxer, best known to win the silver medal in the Super Heavyweight division (+91 kg) at the 2000 Summer Olympics.

Career

At the 1999 World Amateur Boxing Championships in Houston, Texas he also won silver losing to Sinan Şamil Sam.

In 2000 at the Olympics he lost to the Briton Audley Harrison. On his way to the final he has beaten Cuban Alexis Rubalcaba and the Uzbek fighter Rustam Saidov.
Results:
Defeated Grzegorz Kiełsa (Poland) 16-5
Defeated Alexis Rubalcaba (Cuba) 25-12
Defeated Rustam Saidov (Uzbekistan) 28-22
Lost to Audley Harrison (Great Britain) 16-30

He won gold at the Asian Games 1998 but had to settle for silver in 2002 and 2006 losing twice to Saidov. 2004 he finished third.

2003 at the world championships he lost to Sebastian Köber.

He beat him at the Olympics in Athens 2004, but lost to in an early round to eventual winner Alexander Povetkin. Dildabekov qualified for the 2004 Athens Games by ending up in first place at the 1st AIBA Asian 2004 Olympic Qualifying Tournament in Guangzhou, PR China. In the decisive final match of the event he defeated Kyrgyzstan's Ruslan Abasov.

References
sports-reference

1976 births
Living people
People from Shymkent
Super-heavyweight boxers
Boxers at the 2000 Summer Olympics
Boxers at the 2004 Summer Olympics
Olympic silver medalists for Kazakhstan
Olympic boxers of Kazakhstan
Place of birth missing (living people)
Olympic medalists in boxing
Medalists at the 2000 Summer Olympics
Asian Games medalists in boxing
Boxers at the 1998 Asian Games
Boxers at the 2002 Asian Games
Boxers at the 2006 Asian Games
Kazakhstani male boxers
AIBA World Boxing Championships medalists
Asian Games gold medalists for Kazakhstan
Asian Games silver medalists for Kazakhstan
Medalists at the 1998 Asian Games
Medalists at the 2002 Asian Games
Medalists at the 2006 Asian Games